Quince Mil  is an airport serving the village of Quince Mil in the Cusco Region of Peru. The runway is in the strip of land between the Interoceanic Highway and the Araza River, a tributary of the Inambari River. Aerial images show brush growing mid-field.

See also

Transport in Peru
List of airports in Peru

References

External links
OpenStreetMap - Quincemil
OurAirports - Quince Mil

Airports in Peru
Buildings and structures in Cusco Region